The 1988 Indiana Hoosiers football team represented Indiana University Bloomington as a member of the Big Ten Conference during the 1988 NCAA Division I-A football season. Led by fifth-year head coach Bill Mallory, the Hoosiers compiled an overall record of 8–3–1 with a mark of 5–3 in conference play, placing fifth in the Big Ten. Indiana was invited to the Liberty Bowl, where they beat South Carolina. The team played home games at Memorial Stadium in Bloomington, Indiana.

Schedule

Personnel

Game summaries

Purdue

Anthony Thompson rushed 25 times for 167 yards and three touchdowns while breaking the school's career rushing record.

1989 NFL draftees

 Anthony Thompson was drafted in the 1990 NFL Draft.

Awards and honors
 Anthony Thompson, Big Ten Player of the Year
 Anthony Thompson, Chicago Tribune Silver Football

References

Indiana
Indiana Hoosiers football seasons
Liberty Bowl champion seasons
Indiana Hoosiers football